The 2014 Sioux Falls Storm season was the team's fifteenth season as a professional indoor football franchise and sixth in the Indoor Football League (IFL). One of nine teams that competed in the IFL for the 2014 season, the Sioux Falls Storm were members of the United Conference.

Led by head coach Kurtiss Riggs, the Storm played their home games at the Sioux Falls Arena in Sioux Falls, South Dakota. Sioux Falls entered the 2014 season following consecutive wins in the league's "United Bowl" championship game in 2011, 2012, and 2013.

Off-field moves
In mid-April 2014, the team announced that this season would be its last at the aging Sioux Falls Arena. In 2015, the Storm will follow the Sioux Falls Stampede of the United States Hockey League to the newly constructed Denny Sanford Premier Center.

Roster moves
Quarterback Chris Dixon, a three-time IFL MVP, returned to the Storm after one season in the Arena Football League. Dixon previously led the Storm to the IFL championship in 2011 and 2012.

Awards and honors
On February 26, 2014, the IFL announced its Week 1 Players of the Week. Kicker Parker Douglass was named Special Teams Player of the Week. The league cited his perfect night offensively (1-1 on field goals, 7-7 on PATs) as well as his "high booming kickoffs" forcing Nebraska to start offensive drives from deep in their own territory. Several Sioux Falls players also received Honorable Mentions from the league: running back Tory Harrison for offense, linebacker Tyler Knight for defense, and wide receiver/kick returner James Terry for special teams play.

On March 5, 2014, the IFL announced its Week 2 Players of the Week. Sioux Falls Storm linebacker Tyler Knight was named Defensive Player of the Week. Quarterback Chris Dixon and wide receiver Judd Harrold received Honorable Mentions for offense. Kicker Parker Douglass received an Honorable Mention for special teams play. On March 12, 2014, the IFL announced its Week 3 Players of the Week. Sioux Falls Storm linebacker Tyler Knight was named as the Defensive Player of the Week for the second consecutive week. On March 19, 2014, the IFL announced its Week 4 Players of the Week. Sioux Falls Storm kicker Parker Douglass received his second Honorable Mention for special teams play.

On April 2, 2014, the IFL announced its Week 6 Players of the Week. Sioux Falls Storm running back/kick returner Tory Harrison and kicker Parker Douglass were jointly named as the Co-Special Teams Players of the Week. Quarterback Chris Dixon received his second Honorable Mention for offense. Linebacker Tyler Knight and defensive back Patrick Wells each received an Honorable Mention for defense. On April 16, 2014, the IFL announced its Week 8 Players of the Week. Sioux Falls Storm quarterback Chris Dixon was named as the Offensive Player of the Week. Honorable mentions were awarded to wide receiver Jeremiah Oates for offense, linebacker Tyler Knight for defense, and kick returner Tory Harrison for special teams play. On April 23, 2014, the IFL announced its Week 9 Players of the Week. Sioux Falls Storm defensive back Kyle Theret received an Honorable Mention for defense.

Schedule
Key:

Pre-season

Regular season

Postseason

Roster

Standings

References

External links
Sioux Falls Storm official statistics 

Sioux Falls Storm
Sioux Falls Storm
Sioux Falls Storm
United Bowl champion seasons